Xanthoparmelia loxodes is a species of foliose lichen in the family Parmeliaceae. It was first formally described by Finnish botanist William Nylander in 1872, as Parmelia loxodes. In 1978, Ted Esslinger created the genus Neofuscelia, which contained species previously classified in Parmelia subgenus Neofusca; Neofuscelia loxodes was one of many species transferred here. In a 2004 molecular phylogenetic study published by Oscar Blanco, Ana Crespo, John A. Elix, David L. Hawksworth and H. Thorsten Lumbsch, they showed that Neofuscelia did not form a clade distinct from Xanthoparmelia, and they reduced it to synonymy under Xanthoparmelia.

Xanthoparmelia loxodes is widely distributed in Europe, where it grows on siliceous rocks.

See also
List of Xanthoparmelia species

References

loxodes
Lichen species
Lichens described in 1872
Lichens of Europe
Taxa named by William Nylander (botanist)